The Waic languages are spoken in Shan State, Burma, in Northern Thailand, and in Yunnan province, China.

Classification
Gérard Diffloth reconstructed Proto-Waic in a 1980 paper. His classification is as follows (Sidwell 2009). (Note: Individual languages are highlighted in italics.)

Waic
Samtau (later renamed "Blang" by Diffloth)
Samtau
Wa–Lawa–La
Wa proper
Wa
Lawa
Bo Luang
Umphal

The recently discovered Meung Yum and Savaiq languages of Shan State, Burma also belong to the Wa language cluster.

Other Waic languages in Shan State, eastern Myanmar are En and Siam (Hsem), which are referred to by Scott (1900) as En and Son. Hsiu (2015) classifies En, Son, and Tai Loi in Scott (1900) as Waic languages, citing the Waic phonological innovation from Proto-Palaungic *s- > h- instead of the Angkuic phonological innovation from Proto-Palaungic *s- > s-.

References

Further reading
Sidwell, Paul. 2009. Classifying the Austroasiatic languages: history and state of the art. LINCOM studies in Asian linguistics, 76. Munich: Lincom Europa.
Shintani Tadahiko. 2016. The Va (En) language. Linguistic survey of Tay cultural area (LSTCA) no. 108. Tokyo: Research Institute for Languages and Cultures of Asia and Africa (ILCAA).

External links
SOAS Wa Dictionary Project and Internet Database for Minority Languages of Burma (Myanmar)

Languages of Myanmar
Languages of China

Wa people